The 2006 South African Figure Skating Championships were held from 25 through 28 September 2005. Skaters competed in the disciplines of men's and ladies' singles at the senior, novice, and pre-novice levels. There was also a junior and juvenile ladies' competition.

Senior results

Men

Ladies

External links
 Results

South African Figure Skating Championships, 2006
South African Figure Skating Championships